The Paso Robles Event Center, formerly California Mid-State Fairgrounds, is an entertainment complex located in Paso Robles, California. The site opened in 1946 for the annual "California Mid-State Fair" (originally known as the "San Luis Obispo County Fair" [1946-80] and "San Luis Obispo County Mid-State Fair" [1981-85]).

In addition to the fair, concerts, trade shows, conventions and other special events take place at the Event Center.

See also
List of convention centers in the United States

External links
California Mid-State Fair website

Convention centers in California
Buildings and structures in Paso Robles, California
Indoor arenas in California